A referendum on electoral reform was held in Egypt on 12 February 1987. The reform would set aside 48 seats for independent candidates at elections. The change in the law had been hastily adopted in December 1986 in order to pre-empt the Constitutional Court ruling that the 1984 elections had been unconstitutional as they had not allowed independent candidates to stand. The changes were approved by 88.9% of voters, leading to the early dissolution of the People's Assembly and early elections in April.

Results

References

Referendums in Egypt
1987 in Egypt
Egypt
Electoral reform in Egypt
Electoral reform referendums
February 1987 events in Africa